Hamilton Township High School is a public high school located at 1105 Rathmell Road, near Columbus, Ohio, which serves Hamilton Township, Obetz, Lockbourne, Reese, Shadeville, and parts of south Columbus.

Ohio High School Athletic Association State Championships
 Baseball - 1947

Eastland-Fairfield Career & Technical School

References

External links
 District Website
 News article about the school

High schools in Franklin County, Ohio
Public high schools in Ohio